Francisco Almeida (born 5 June 1995) is an Angolan handball player for Primeiro de Agosto and the Angolan national team.

He represented Angola at the 2019 World Men's Handball Championship.

References

1995 births
Living people
Angolan male handball players